Donald Johnson and Jared Palmer were the defending champions, but lost in the semifinals to Jonas Björkman and Todd Woodbridge.

Björkman and Woodbridge defeated Mark Knowles and Daniel Nestor in the final, 6–1, 6–2, 6–7(7–9), 7–5, to win the gentlemen's doubles title at the 2002 Wimbledon Championships

Seeds

  Donald Johnson /  Jared Palmer (semifinals)
  Mark Knowles /  Daniel Nestor (final)
  Mahesh Bhupathi /  Max Mirnyi (quarterfinals)
  Wayne Black /  Kevin Ullyett (second round)
  Jonas Björkman /  Todd Woodbridge (champions)
  Bob Bryan /  Mike Bryan (semifinals)
  Martin Damm /  Cyril Suk (quarterfinals)
  David Prinosil /  David Rikl (quarterfinals)
  Paul Haarhuis /  Yevgeny Kafelnikov (third round)
  Jiří Novák /  Radek Štěpánek (second round)
  Ellis Ferreira /  Rick Leach (second round)
  Joshua Eagle  /  Sandon Stolle (third round)
  Michaël Llodra /  Fabrice Santoro (first round, retired)
  Julien Boutter /  Sjeng Schalken (third round)
  Brian MacPhie /  Nenad Zimonjić (third round)
  Lucas Arnold Ker /  Gastón Etlis (first round)

Qualifying

Draw

Finals

Top half

Section 1

Section 2

Bottom half

Section 3

Section 4

References

External links

2002 Wimbledon Championships – Men's draws and results at the International Tennis Federation

Men's Doubles
Wimbledon Championship by year – Men's doubles